Chak 130 SB is a village in Sillanwali Tehsil, Sargodha District in Punjab, Pakistan. Its neighbouring villages are Chak 132 SB, Chak 131 SB, Chak 28 SB, and Chak 50 SB. This village is an agricultural area.

Being a part of Kirana Bar it was colonized by the British Raj after World War I. Almost all of the villagers were immigrants who came at the time of the Partition of India. Most of the immigrants belonged to the Jalander, Amritsar, and Ambala districts of pre-partitioned Punjab. 

Nowadays most of the land owning families belong to Arain, Rajput, Jutt and Muhajir Pathan communities. Labourers have settled from the adjoining areas of Jhang District, and belong to the Syal and Musalli communities.

Facilities
The village has a Boys Middle School, Boys Primary School and Girls Primary school. The telephone exchange serving nearby villages is located in it. A rural health centre and a veterinary hospital are also situated in the village.

The nearest city is Sillanwali which is the Tehsil headquarters and location of the police station.

Populated places in Sargodha District